Lee Jun-young (born January 22, 1997), also known as Jun, is a South Korean singer, rapper and actor. In June 2014, he debuted as a member of U-KISS. In October 2017, he joined survival program The Unit, in which he finished in first place and became a member of the project group UNB.

Apart from his group's activities, he has participated in various television dramas, notably Avengers Social Club (2017), marking his career breakthrough, Goodbye to Goodbye (2018), Class of Lies (2019), Good Casting (2020), Please Don’t Date Him (2020), Imitation (2021), and Let Me Be Your Knight (2021).

Career

2014: Career beginnings 
On May 15, 2014, NH Media announced, via U-KISS's official Korean website, new member Jun to the public. On June 2, 2014 Jun made his debut with U-KISS and the group released its ninth mini album Mono Scandal along with the 19+ rated music video of the album's title track "Quit Playing."

2017–present: Acting roles and UNB 
In 2017, he debuted as an actor in the television series Avengers Social Club.

On October 28, 2017, Lee joined survival program The Unit. He made it to the final Top 9 and was voted number one. He promoted with UNB, which consisted of finalists from the show, from April 7, 2018 to January 27, 2019.

From April to May, Lee appeared as “Compass” on MBC's TV program King of Mask Singer. He performed a duet with Lee Sang-hoon of "It Was Like That Then" and a solo cover version of "Eraser". In May 2018, he made his second acting appearance as Han Min-soo in the MBC television series Goodbye to Goodbye (2018)  and received a new actor award at the 2018 MBC Drama Awards.

On April 10, 2019 Lee released his first Japanese solo single "Phenomenal World," which explored the futurepop genre. He performed his first solo showcase in Tokyo on February 4. Prior to the release, he also held a series of concerts on April 6 in Osaka and April 8 in Tokyo. Tower Records Japan ranked "Phenomenal World" as the #7 best-selling Japanese single by a Korean artist for the first half of 2019. He starred in the OCN television series Class of Lies, which aired from July 17 to September 5. On November 6, he released both a Korean and Japanese version of his solo single "My Way," for which he wrote the lyrics. The single featured rapper Reddy and was produced by Sway D and was accompanied by two music videos. After a digital download was released on October 30, the Japanese version ranked #2 on the dwango.jp K-POP Life weekly singles chart. On November 28, he released his first Korean solo single "Tell". On December 5, he made his solo debut in Korea with the title track "Curious About U" and the single album Gallery. 

On January 22, 2020, Lee released his first Japanese album 22 which featured the title track "Come Alive". In 2020, he acted in the musical Swag Age: Shout out, Chosun! and received a new actor award at the fifth Korea Musical Awards. He played Kang Woo-won in the SBS television series Good Casting (2020), which was entirely pre-produced and he made a special appearance in the SBS drama Backstreet Rookie. Later that year, Lee acted in the MBC Every 1 drama Please Don't Date Him. He participated in the soundtrack for Please Don't Date Him with the single "To you who will be tired". On October 7, he released a new Korean single "Amen", which explored his interest in rap and hip hop.  

In 2021, Lee starred in the KBS drama Imitation (2021) as a talented idol, he joined the Netflix film Love and Leashes with Seohyun, and he was cast in the dramas D.P. and Let Me Be Your Knight. After departing NH Media in August, he announced in November that he co-founded a new company J-flex, which will serve as his current agency for his acting projects.

Discography

Extended plays

Single albums

Singles

As lead artist

As featured artist

Collaborations

Soundtrack appearances

Filmography

Film

Television series

Web series

Television shows

Musical

Awards and nominations

Listicles

Notes

References

External links 
 
 
 

1997 births
Living people
South Korean male television actors
South Korean male film actors
MBK Entertainment artists
South_Korean_male_idols